NGC 7184 is a barred spiral galaxy located in the constellation Aquarius. It is located at a distance of circa 100 million light years from Earth, which, given its apparent dimensions, means that NGC 7184 is about 175,000 light years across. It was discovered by William Herschel on October 28, 1783.

Characteristics 
NGC 7184 has a small, bright nucleus and an elliptical bulge, whose major axis is aligned with the major axis of the disk. There is a bar along the minor axis of the bulge, but the high inclination of the galaxy makes its presence uncertain. From the bar emanate two tightly wound symmetrical spiral arms that form a bright inner ring. The diameter of the ring along its major axis is 1.71 arcminutes. The arms feature HII regions, and as they emerge from the ring are flocculent, based on the HII distribution, while they begin to split again at the outermost part of the galaxy. Dust lanes are observed in the inner part of the disk.

An outlying HII region has been discovered near NGC 7184. It is located on the major axis of the optical disk, on the northeasterly receding edge. Its size is estimated to be 270 pc at the distance of the galaxy and its Hα luminosity, 1037.6 erg s−1. It could be an isolated extension of a spiral arm.

Supernova 
One supernova has been observed in NGC 7184, SN 1984N. It was discovered visually by Robert Evans at magnitude 14, 60" east and 65" north of the nucleus on July 20, 1984. Its discovery was confirmed by T. Cragg at the Anglo-Australian Observatory. Initially it was thought to be a variable star in our galaxy, but later study of the object revealed it was indeed a supernova. It was identified as type I.

Nearby galaxies 
NGC 7184 is the foremost galaxy of a small galaxy group known as the NGC 7184 group, which also includes NGC 7183. A satellite galaxy lies 3 arcminutes to the south, at a projected separation of 28 kpc.

References

External links 

Barred spiral galaxies
Aquarius (constellation)
7184
UGCA objects
67904
Discoveries by William Herschel
Astronomical objects discovered in 1783